The International Journal of Multicultural Education is a peer-reviewed academic journal published by the Loeb School of Education at Eastern University (St. Davids, Pennsylvania, United States).

The journal was founded in 1999 as Electronic Magazine of Multicultural Education, the journal provides a forum in which scholars, practitioners, and students of multicultural education share ideas to promote educational equity, cross-cultural understanding, and global awareness in all levels of education.

The journal publishes qualitative empirical research reports, articles that advance scholarship in the field of multicultural education; praxis essays relating successful multicultural education programs or practical ideas and strategies for instruction from the multicultural perspective. It also publishes a variety of reviews, including reviews of the visual arts, professional and children's books, and multimedia resources.

The journal is published as an online open access journal.

References

External links

Education journals
Open access journals
Multiculturalism in the United States
Publications established in 1999
Eastern University (United States)
Academic journals published by university presses